The Grey Stone of Trough is an historic boundary marker in Bowland Forest High, in the Trough of Bowland, Lancashire, England. A Grade II listed structure, erected in 1897 and standing on Trough Road, it marks the line of the pre-1974 county boundary between Lancashire and the West Riding of Yorkshire. Historically, the Trough marked the westernmost boundary of the ancient Lordship of Bowland.

It is in sandstone and has a triangular section with inscriptions on the two sides that face the road.

Inscriptions
Lancashire side

"To Lancaster, 12 miles. Bay Horse, 10 miles"

Yorkshire side

"To Whitewell, 5 miles. Clitheroe, 12.5 miles"

Gallery

References

Grade II listed buildings in Lancashire
Boundary markers
1897 establishments in England
Forest of Bowland
Buildings and structures in Ribble Valley
Buildings and structures in the City of Lancaster